The Saab 9-4X is a mid-size luxury crossover SUV that was introduced at the 2010 LA Auto Show. It is based on the all-wheel-drive GM Theta Premium platform, which also forms the basis for the Cadillac SRX. Production of the 9-4X began in 2011, at General Motors' Ramos Arizpe Assembly in Mexico, but halted before the end of that year due to the bankruptcy of Saab, a total of 814 assembled.

Design

The 9-4X took shape once the Saab 9-6X project was canceled, after the divestment by General Motors of its holding in Subaru. The 9-4X replaced the larger Chevy Trailblazer based Saab 9-7X built in the U.S. that was discontinued in December 2008. The concept of the 9-4X made its debut at the 2008 North American International Auto Show.

The production car is almost identical to the concept of 2008 on the exterior and similar to the second generation Saab 9-5 on the inside. The mechanical parts such as the engine, transmission, and other mechanical systems are all GM with exterior trim and lighting specific to the 9-4X.

As such, a review noted specific Saab identity and "charm" as well as its flaws that included excess weight and lackluster fuel economy, but "it is easily as compelling as the Cadillac SRX on which it is based." The car began selling as a 2011 model year in June in the United States and in August elsewhere. A 2012 Aero version was reviewed by Road & Track in April 2011.

The 9-4X was the only Saab built in Mexico.

Production
General Motors manufactured the 9-4X and the closely related Cadillac SRX at the Ramos Arizpe, Mexico, assembly plant. The company announced that the 9-4X would go on sale in 2010 to bolster Saab's position in the United States, the brand's largest marketplace.

The first unit was produced in February 2011, and it was displayed at Saab's Museum in Sweden. In November 2011, GM announced that production of the 9-4X would end, because General Motors was unwilling to provide a modern chassis and engine to a Chinese buyer that was a potential competitor to GM in China.

In February 2010, GM sold Saab Automobile AB to the Dutch automobile manufacturer Spyker Cars N.V.

According to information at the Saab Museum in Trollhättan, Sweden, 814 9-4X units were produced. 

According to the Saab 9-4X Production Report, a total of 673 production 9-4X's were produced plus approximately 130 test cars for a grand total of 803 9-4X's ever built.

Specifications
The 2.8T engine is mated to an Aisin-Warner six speed automatic transmission, operable in manumatic mode via paddle shifters. A diesel engine for the market in Europe was discussed, but not offered.

References

External links

Saab 9-4X forum, tutorials, and media archive on SaabWorld

9-4X
Crossover sport utility vehicles
Compact sport utility vehicles
Luxury sport utility vehicles
All-wheel-drive vehicles
Cars introduced in 2010